The 1993 European Karate Championships, the 28th edition, was held in Prague, Czech Republic from May 2 to 4, 1993.

Medallists

Men's Competition

Individual

Team

Women's competition

Individual

Team

Medal table

References

External links
 Karate Records - European Championship 1993

1993
International sports competitions hosted by the Czech Republic
European Karate Championships
European championships in 1993
Sports competitions in Prague
1990s in Prague
Karate competitions in the Czech Republic
May 1993 sports events in Europe